My Irish Molly is a 1938 British musical film, directed by Alex Bryce and starring Binkie Stuart, Tom Burke and Maureen O'Hara shot at Welwyn Studios with footage of Ireland. The screenplay concerns a young orphan who runs away from her mean-spirited guardian to live with her aunt. O'Hara appeared in the film under her real name of Maureen FitzSimmons. The film was released in the US in 1940 under the title My Little Molly with scenes of Binkie Stuart removed due to Maureen O'Hara being given top billing due to her American popularity.

Plot
In a rural village in Ireland, Molly Martin, an adorable young moppet has been ordered to live with her Aunt Hannah. Molly prefers to live with her other Aunt, the kind widow Mrs O'Shea, the sister of Hannah. Mrs O'Shea's daughter Eileen is in love with Sonny Gallagher who seeks his fortune in New York City as a taxi driver.

An American writer named Bob and his photographer Chuck are guests of the O'Sheas as they write travel stories on Ireland illustrated with Chuck's photographs. When Chuck sends a photograph of Molly to New York she is selected to be the poster girl of an American company named Shamrock. Accompanying Molly is Eileen who seeks to find Sonny who is hiding from her due to his losing his job and being unable to find another one. Sonny returns to Ireland to set things right with Molly, her two Aunts, and Eileen, who has fallen in love with Bob.

Cast
 Binkie Stuart – Molly Martin 
 Tom Burke – Sonny Gallagher 
 Phillip Reed – Bob 
 Maureen O'Hara – Eileen O'Shea
 Maire O'Neill – Mrs. O'Shea 
 C. Denier Warren – Chuck 
 Maureen Moore – Hannah Delaney 
 Franklin Kelsey – Liam Delaney 
 Leo McCabe – Corney

Soundtrack
 Danny Boy (traditional)
Sung by Thomas Burke
 Eileen Allanagh (traditional)
Sung by the cast
'I'll Be Off to Tipperary in the Morning
written by Billy O’Brien and Raymond Wallace
Sung by Thomas Burke
 Farmyard Frolics
written by Christine Makgill
Sung by Binkie Stuart
Kathleen Mavourneen
written by Frederick Crouch with lyrics by a Mrs. Crawford

References

External links

1938 films
1938 musical comedy films
Films directed by Alex Bryce
British black-and-white films
Films set in Ireland
British musical comedy films
1930s English-language films
1930s British films